Julian Koch (born 11 November 1990) is a German former professional footballer who played as a defensive midfielder.

Personal life
He graduated in 2009 his Abitur from the Goethe-Gymnasium Dortmund.

Club career

Borussia Dortmund
Koch was born in Schwerte and settled 1991 with his family to Dortmund, here began Koch his career with VfL Hörde. In summer 2001 left VfL Hörde and signed an youth contract for Borussia Dortmund. After seven years on youth side for Borussia Dortmund he was in July 2008 promoted to the reserve side and earned his first cap in the Regionalliga West against 1. FSV Mainz 05 II. On 6 March 2010, he made his Bundesliga debut for Borussia Dortmund in a 3–0 win against Borussia Mönchengladbach. On 2 May 2012, despite missing the entire 2011–12 season because of knee injury, he signed a new two-year contract.

MSV Duisburg
On 18 May 2010, Koch agreed a loan deal with MSV Duisburg until the end of the 2010–11 season. Koch sustained a knee injury during a match against Rot-Weiß Oberhausen and missed the rest of the season, including the 2011 DFB-Pokal Final against Schalke 04. On 8 May 2012, it was announced that Koch would rejoin Duisburg on a season-long loan deal effective from 1 July 2012.

Mainz 05
On 5 June 2013, Koch completed a transfer to 1. FSV Mainz 05 for an undisclosed fee.

Koch signed with 2. Bundesliga side FC St. Pauli on loan until the end of the 2014–15 season. Whilst on loan, Koch scored an incredible goal after intercepting the opposition kick off and blasting the ball into the back of the net.

Ferencváros
In January 2017 Koch moved to Hungary joining Nemzeti Bajnokság I club Ferencváros. For much of his time there, he was injured. Until his release in summer 2019 he made 22 appearances across all competitions and won the league in 2019 and the cup in 2017.

He retired after being released by Ferencváros.

International career
Koch earned in 2007 his first international cap for the Germany national under-17 team and played 2008 one game for the Germany U18. He made on 13 November 2009 his debut for the Germany U20 in a friendly game against Austria.

Career statistics

Honours
Ferencváros
 Nemzeti Bajnokság I: 2018–19
 Magyar Kupa: 2016–17

References

External links

 

1990 births
Living people
People from Schwerte
Sportspeople from Arnsberg (region)
Association football defenders
German footballers
Germany youth international footballers
Germany under-21 international footballers
Bundesliga players
2. Bundesliga players
3. Liga players
Regionalliga players
Borussia Dortmund II players
Borussia Dortmund players
MSV Duisburg players
MSV Duisburg II players
1. FSV Mainz 05 players
FC St. Pauli players
Ferencvárosi TC footballers
Nemzeti Bajnokság I players
German expatriate footballers
German expatriate sportspeople in Hungary
Expatriate footballers in Hungary
Footballers from North Rhine-Westphalia